Kashif Shafi (born 14 January 1976) is a Pakistani first-class cricketer who played for Lahore cricket team.

References

External links
 

1976 births
Living people
Pakistani cricketers
Lahore cricketers
Cricketers from Lahore